Maryevka is a rural locality (a sloboda) and the administrative center of Maryevskoye Rural Settlement, Olkhovatsky District, Voronezh Oblast, Russia. The population was 590 as of 2010. There are 7 streets.

Geography 
Maryevka is located 14 km northwest of Olkhovatka (the district's administrative centre) by road. Gvozdovka is the nearest rural locality.

References 

Rural localities in Olkhovatsky District